Succession is an American satirical black comedy-drama and family saga television series created by Jesse Armstrong for HBO. The series centers on the Roy family, the owners of Waystar RoyCo, a global media and entertainment conglomerate, who are fighting for control of the company amid uncertainty about the health of the family's patriarch, Logan Roy portrayed by Brian Cox. It stars an ensemble cast including Jeremy Strong, Kieran Culkin, Sarah Snook, Matthew Macfadyen, Nicholas Braun, Alan Ruck, Hiam Abbass, Peter Friedman, Natalie Gold, and Rob Yang, with Dagmara Domińczyk, Arian Moayed, J. Smith-Cameron, Justine Lupe, David Rasche, and Fisher Stevens featured in recurring roles before being promoted to the main cast.

The series has been widely acclaimed by critics for its writing, acting, musical score, production values, and examination of its subject matter. Succession has been nominated for many awards, including 48 Primetime Emmy Awards (13 wins), nine Golden Globe Awards (five wins), one Grammy Award, 13 Critics' Choice Television Awards (five wins), two Producers Guild of America Awards (won both), six Writers Guild of America Awards (four wins), and one Peabody Awards (won). It was also selected by the American Film Institute as one of its top 10 television programs of the year for the series' first three seasons.

Succession won the Primetime Emmy Award for Outstanding Drama Series and the Golden Globe Award for Best Television Series – Drama in 2020 and 2022. Strong won both the Primetime Emmy Award for Outstanding Lead Actor in a Drama Series and the Golden Globe Award for Best Actor – Television Series Drama, while Macfadyen won the Primetime Emmy Award for Outstanding Supporting Actor in a Drama Series. Cox and Snook have won Golden Globe Awards for their performances in the series. The main cast also won the Screen Actors Guild Award for Outstanding Performance by an Ensemble in a Drama Series in 2022. Armstrong has three wins for the Primetime Emmy Award for Outstanding Writing for a Drama Series.

Awards and nominations

Notes

References

External links
 

Succession
+Awards list